Peter Weiss (born 16 December 1938) is an Austrian boxer. He is the son of the flyweight boxer Ernst Weiss. He competed at the 1960 Summer Olympics and the 1964 Summer Olympics.

References

1938 births
Living people
Austrian male boxers
Olympic boxers of Austria
Boxers at the 1960 Summer Olympics
Boxers at the 1964 Summer Olympics
Boxers from Berlin
Bantamweight boxers
20th-century Austrian people